The Cal State Fullerton Titans men's basketball team is the basketball team that represents California State University, Fullerton in Fullerton, California, United States.  The school's team currently competes in the Big West Conference.

History
In 1978, the Fullerton men's basketball team, coached by Bobby Dye, made it to the Elite 8 in the 1978 NCAA Division I basketball tournament. They were considered the year's Cinderella story as a #7 seed (out of 8). The team defeated University of New Mexico at Tempe, AZ, and then defeated the University of San Francisco before losing to the University of Arkansas in regionals at Albuquerque, New Mexico. Fullerton was led by Greg Bunch, a CSUF Hall of Famer.

Bob Burton was head coach of the Titans men's team starting with the 2003–04 season. In 2008, the team finished the season 24-9, defeated UC Irvine 81-66 in the Big West Conference Championship. They qualified for their second NCAA tournament (first in 30 years), where they faced the (#3) Wisconsin Badgers as a #14 seed in the first round of the NCAA tournament, losing the game 71–58. After the 2013–14 season, Burton resigned on June 22, 2012 after nine seasons. His final record at Fullerton was 155–122.

During the 2012–13 season, interim head coach Andy Newman replaced Burton and guided the Titans to a 14–18 record overall and 6–12 record in the Big West Conference.

For the start of the 2013–14 season, Fullerton hired Dedrique Taylor as the team's head coach. Previously, Taylor had been an assistant under coach Herb Sendek at Arizona State University since 2006. Prior to that, Taylor also coached at the University of Nevada, Portland State, Loyola Marymount University and UC Davis. Taylor, has been long respected as one of the top recruiters in the west with strong ties to the Los Angeles area, thought to be a key component in winning at Fullerton. Taylor led the 2017–18 team to an invitation to play in the 2018 NCAA Division I men's basketball tournament. The team lost in the first round to Purdue.

Post season results

NCAA tournament results
The Titans have appeared in four NCAA tournaments. Their combined record is 2–4.

NIT results
The Titans have appeared in three National Invitation Tournaments (NIT). Their combined record is 2–3.

CIT results
The Titans have appeared in the CollegeInsider.com Postseason Tournament (CIT) three times. Their combined record is 0–3.

NAIA tournament results
The Titans have appeared in the NAIA Tournament one time. Their combined record is 2–1.

Retired numbers

NBA players

Players in international leagues

 Khalil Ahmad (born 1996), basketball player in the Israeli Basketball Premier League
Kwame Vaughn (born 1990), basketball player for Maccabi Haifa in the Israeli Basketball National League 
Marcio Lassiter, Filipino-American basketball player for San Miguel Beermen in the PBA

References

External links